The minister of the Interior is the ultimate authority for public security in Austria as well as the head and chief executive of the Ministry of the Interior.

The incumbent minister of the Interior is Gerhard Karner (ÖVP). The minister is appointed by the president on advice of the chancellor.

Powers and duties 
The Federal Constitutional Law itself expressly designates the minister as the supreme authority in matters of public security and places the police directorates immediately beneath the control of the minister. In this capacity, and as a supreme executive organ, the minister bears ultimate responsibly for the direction of law enforcement and the administration of security policy, and cannot be overruled by any other officer or body within the executive branch. The minister is assisted by a secretary general, who administers the day-to-day ministerial operations, and by a director general for public security, who serves as Austria's top career law enforcement officer and superintends most specialized police agencies.

The minister of the interior is the only constitutionally mandated minister position in Austria.

List of ministers

Austrian Empire

Cisleithania

First Republic

Second Republic

References 

Interior ministers of Austria
Lists of government ministers of Austria